
Year 822 (DCCCXXII) was a common year starting on Wednesday (link will display the full calendar) of the Julian calendar.

Events 
 By place 
 Byzantine Empire 
 Byzantine general and usurper Thomas the Slav continues his revolt against Emperor Michael II. He unsuccessfully besieges Constantinople, while his fleet is destroyed by Michael's fleet, using Greek fire. 
 Battle of Kedouktos (near Heraclea): Khan Omurtag of Bulgaria sends a relief army, and defeats the Byzantine rebels. 

 Europe 
 Emperor Louis I performs public penance for causing his nephew Bernard's death 4 years earlier, at his palace of Attigny (Ardennes), before Pope Paschal I, and the Frankish nobles (this to restore harmony and re-establish his authority).
 The earliest known mention of the Serbs, in Einhard's Royal Frankish Annals.

 Britain 
 King Ceolwulf I of Mercia invades Powys (Wales), but is beaten back by King Cyngen. However, Ceolwulf does destroy the fortress of Deganwy, and later takes the kingdom under his control (approximate date).

 Al-Andalus 
 Al-Hakam I, Umayyad emir of Córdoba, dies after a 26-year reign. He is succeeded by his son Abd al-Rahman II, who begins a military campaign against King Alfonso II of Asturias in Al-Andalus (modern Spain).

 Asia 
 Kim Heon-chang launches a short-lived rebellion in Silla, which gains control over much of the southern and western Korean Peninsula.

 Central America 
 February 6 – Ukit Took becomes the last ruler (ajaw) of the Mayan city-state Copán (modern Guatemala).  After his death in 830, the kingdom is wiped out, most likely from an epidemic.

 By topic 
 Religion 
 Rabanus Maurus, a Frankish Benedictine monk, becomes abbot of Fulda, after the death of Eigil.

Births 
 Al-Mutawakkil, Muslim caliph (d. 861)
 Ibn Abi Asim, Muslim Sunni scholar (or 821)
 Minamoto no Tōru, Japanese poet (d. 895)
 Xuefeng Yicun, Chinese Chan master (d. 908)

Deaths 
 June 26 – Saichō, Japanese Buddhist monk (b. 767)
 Al-Hakam I, Muslim emir of Córdoba (b. 771)
 Al-Waqidi, Muslim historian and biographer
 Denebeorht, bishop of Worcester
 Eigil of Fulda, Bavarian abbot 
 Gregory Pterotos, Byzantine general (strategos)
 Kim Heon-chang, Silla aristocrat and rebel leader
 Li Yijian, chancellor of the Tang Dynasty (b. 756)
 Tahir ibn Husayn, founder of the Tahirid Dynasty
 Tian Bu, general of the Tang Dynasty (b. 785)
 Winiges, duke of Spoleto (Italy)

References